Ragnheiður Elín Árnadóttir (born 30 September 1967) is an Icelandic politician who is the director of the OECD Development Centre. She was previously the Minister of Industry and Commerce between 2013 and 2017 and an elected Member of Parliament for the Independence Party between 2007 and 2016.

References

External links 
 Ragnheiður Elín Árnadóttir - Director, OECD Development Centre
 Non auto-biography of Ragnheiður Elín Árnadóttir on the parliament website

1967 births
Living people
Ragnheidur Elin Arnadottir
Ragnheidur Elin Arnadottir
Ragnheidur Elin Arnadottir